The 1928–29 Detroit Cougars season was the third season of play for the Detroit National Hockey League franchise. The Cougars placed third in the American Division to advance to the playoffs for the first time. The Cougars lost in the first round to the Toronto Maple Leafs.

Offseason
After the 1927–28 season, the Cougars traded the rights to Jack Arbour and $12,500 to the Toronto Maple Leafs for Jimmy "Sailor" Herbert.

Regular season

Final standings

Record vs. opponents

Schedule and results

Playoffs

(C3) Toronto Maple Leafs vs. (A3) Detroit Cougars

Toronto wins a total goal series 7 goals to 2.

Player statistics

Regular season
Scoring

Goaltending

Playoffs
Scoring

Goaltending

Note: GP = Games played; G = Goals; A = Assists; Pts = Points; PIM = Penalty minutes; PPG = Power-play goals; SHG = Short-handed goals; GWG = Game-winning goals
      MIN = Minutes played; W = Wins; L = Losses; T = Ties; GA = Goals against; GAA = Goals against average; SO = Shutouts;

Awards and records

Transactions

See also
1928–29 NHL season

References

Bibliography

External links

Detroit
Detroit
Detroit Red Wings seasons
Detroit Cougars
Detroit Cougars